Luna Park is a play written by Latina-American playwright Caridad Svich in 2005. Commissioned by International High School in San Francisco, CA, the play was first performed as a workshop production in late 2005.

Summary
The play consists of two acts, the first act taking place "before" the main event of the play and the second act taking place "after" the main event, although the action does not always flow chronologically. In the first act, the characters spend the day at the local amusement park, Luna Park, enjoying themselves. Relationships between Lee, Kayla, Daniel, and Leslie begin to develop, before the park is tragically attacked by some unknown foe. In the process, Cory commits suicide, while the others suffer minor injuries but live. During the second act, the characters attempt to deal with their loss, anger and other emotions, while Lee, Kayla, Daniel, and Leslie follow through with their relationships, Daniel and Leslie become engaged. The play lacks a final resolution per se; the audience is somewhat "left hanging."

Characters
Lee
Flaco
Cory
Daniel
Kayla
Monica
Leslie
Optional chorus (four males, three females)

Original production
The play was originally performed by a group of students and directed by Martha Stookey at the International High School of San Francisco in November 2005. It ran six productions for two weekends, each performance selling out.

Sources
https://web.archive.org/web/20110627102807/http://www.playscripts.com/plays/lunapark.pdf

American plays
2005 plays